HMS Calcutta was a  light cruiser of the Royal Navy, named after the Indian city of Calcutta. She was part of the Carlisle group of the C class of cruisers. She was laid down by Vickers Limited at Barrow-in-Furness in 1917 and launched on 9 July 1918. Calcutta was commissioned too late to see action in the First World War and was converted to an anti-aircraft cruiser in 1939. Calcutta served during the Norwegian Campaign and the evacuation from Dunkirk in 1940. She was used to escort allied convoys across the Mediterranean and was sunk on 1 June 1941 by Luftwaffe  aircraft off Alexandria, Egypt.

Construction and design
Calcutta was laid down at Vickers' Barrow-in-Furness shipyard on 28 January 1917 and launched on 9 July 1918, completing in August 1919.

As built, Calcuttas main armament consisted of five BL 6 inch Mk XII naval guns, carried in single mounts, with an anti-aircraft armament of two QF 3-inch 20 cwt guns and two 2-pounder pom-pom autocannon. Eight 21-inch (533 mm) torpedo tubes were carried, in four twin mounts. She had a complement of 432 officers and ratings.

Modification
In August 1938 Calcutta started conversion at Chatham Dockyard to an anti-aircraft cruiser. The conversion involved removal of all guns and torpedo tubes, with eight QF 4 inch Mk XVI naval guns in four twin mounts being fitted, with a close-in armament of a quadruple 2-pounder pom-pom and two quadruple Vickers .50 machine gun mounts. The conversion was completed in July 1939.

Service
Following commissioning, Calcutta joined the 8th Light Cruiser Squadron on the North America and West Indies Station, based at the Royal Naval Dockyard in the Imperial fortress colony of Bermuda, as Flagship. In December 1919 it helped put down violence in Trinidad and Tobago during a General Strike there. On 6 March 1920, the American cargo ship  caught fire in Port of Spain harbour. Calcutta sent some of her crew to try and fight the fire and used her boats to rescue Balabacs crew. Calcutta remained on the North America and West Indies Station until 1926, when she sustained structural damage from being dashed against a jetty at the Bermuda dockyard in the 1926 Havana–Bermuda hurricane on 21 October, the hurricane also sinking the sloop  while at sea.

Following repair and a period in reserve, Calcutta was recommissioned on 18 September 1929 as the flagship of the 6th Cruiser Squadron serving on the Africa Station, based at Simon's Town, South Africa, serving on that station until returning to the United Kingdom and paying off into reserve in 1931.

Second World War
Following conversion to an anti-aircraft cruiser, Calcutta joined the Home Fleet in August 1939 and in September was allocated to the Humber Force, acting as an anti-aircraft escort for convoys in the North Sea. She returned to the Home Fleet in February but continued to escort convoys as well as the Fleet.

In April 1940, Germany invaded Norway and Calcutta was one of the units of the Home Fleet deployed in response. On 30 April, operations began to evacuate British and French troops from Åndalsnes, with Calcutta providing anti-aircraft cover for the evacuation operations. Calcutta and Auckland evacuated the rearguard from Åndalsnes on the night of 1/2 May, with Calcutta embarking 756 officers and men.

At the end of May 1940, Calcutta took part in Operation Dynamo, the evacuation of the British Expeditionary Force from Dunkirk. She evacuated 656 troops on the night of 27/28 May 1940, when she operated off La Panne, and a further 1,200 troops on the night of 28/29 May.  Calcutta again operated off Dunkirk on the night of 31 May/1 June, and was slightly damaged by near-misses by German bombs on 2 June.

Following the completion of the evacuation from Dunkirk, British Forces continued to operate in France, with Operation Aerial taking part in the second half of June 1940 to evacuate the remainder of British forces from ports in the west of France. Calcutta took part in Operation Aerial, providing anti-aircraft cover for evacuations from Saint-Jean-de-Luz in the far South-East of France, near the border with Spain from 23 to 25 June, when the Armistice between France and Germany ended the evacuations. The front of Fraser sank quickly, while the aft part was scuttled by Restigouche. Calcutta was undamaged.

On 30 August Calcutta set off from Gibraltar as part of Operation Hats, which had the purpose of strengthening the British Mediterranean Fleet based in Egypt while simultaneously escorting a supply convoy to Malta. Calcutta formed part of Force F, the reinforcements for the Mediterranean Fleet, and together with sister ship  and the battleship  delivered personnel and stores to Malta on 2 September after Force F met up with the Mediterranean Fleet, reaching Alexandria on 6 September. On 8 October 1940, Calcutta, together with Coventry and four destroyers, formed the close escort of Convoy MF.3 to Malta, reaching Malta on 11 September, with Calcutta and Coventry forming part of the escort of the return convoy MF4.

Calcutta provided anti-aircraft support for the battleships , Valiant and  when they bombarded Bardia on 3 January, then on 7 January set off from Alexandria as part of the escort of Malta Convoy MW5. This was part of a complex series of operations, with another Malta convoy, Operation Excess being simultaneously run from Gibraltar. Convoy MW5 arrived unharmed at Malta on 10 January, but the escort for the Operation Excess convoy was heavily hit by German dive bombers, sinking the cruiser  and badly damaging the aircraft carrier  and the cruiser . During March 1941, Calcutta escorted a series of troop convoys, known as Operation Lustre, carrying four British divisions from Egypt to Greece. An Italian attempt to attack these convoys resulted in the Battle of Cape Matapan in which three Italian heavy cruisers were sunk.

On 18 April 1941 Calcutta sailed with the Mediterranean Fleet when it escorted the fast transport  to Malta, continuing to escort the fleet as it bombarded the port of Tripoli on 20 April. On 24 April, the Mediterranean Fleet launched Operation Demon, the evacuation of British and Commonwealth forces from Greece, with Calcutta taking part in the evacuations. Between 6 and 12 May, Calcutta set out from Alexandria as part of the escort of Malta-bound convoy MW7, before joining the Operation Tiger convoy ferrying tanks from Gibraltar to Egypt.

On 20 May, Germany launched an invasion of Crete by airborne troops. The British Mediterranean Fleet deployed to counter any sea-borne reinforcement of the German forces, with three groups of cruisers and destroyers (Forces B, C and D) deployed to the north of Crete to intercept invasion convoys, while a force of battleships and destroyers (Force A1) provided cover in case the Italian Navy attempted to intervene. Calcutta was sent from Alexandria to join Force C, meeting it on 21 May. Force C came under heavy attack by German and Italian aircraft during 21 May, with the destroyer  being sunk. While the convoy was forced to turn back, heavy German air attacks caused the commander of Force C, Rear-Admiral King, to break off the attack. The air attacks damaged the cruisers  and  before Force C rejoined the covering Force A1. Force A1 was ordered back to Alexandria early on 23 May to restock anti-aircraft ammunition.

On the night of 31 May/1 June 1941, a final effort was made to evacuate the remaining troops from Sfakia, with the cruiser Phoebe, the minelayer  and the destroyers ,  and  picked up a further 3,710 men. Calcutta was hit by two bombs and sank, with 255 men being rescued by Coventry and 107 men killed or missing.

References

Bibliography

External links
  Transcription of ship's logbooks September 1920 to September 1923

 

1918 ships
Ships built in Barrow-in-Furness
C-class cruisers
Maritime incidents in June 1940
Maritime incidents in June 1941
Cruisers sunk by aircraft
World War I cruisers of the United Kingdom
World War II cruisers of the United Kingdom
World War II shipwrecks in the Mediterranean Sea
Ships sunk by German aircraft